Wy'east Falls (also Wyeast Falls or Wy East Falls) is a waterfall on a small tributary of Eagle Creek in Hood River County, Oregon, U.S.

The waterfall is formed by Wy'East Creek, a spring-fed stream that plunges  over the Eagle Creek basalt formation. The creek then flows for about  before emptying into Eagle Creek shortly downstream of Tunnel Falls.

Name
The waterfall was named Wy'east after the nearby campsite, which in turn takes its name from the local indigenous name for the nearby volcano Mount Hood.

See also
List of waterfalls on Eagle Creek and its tributaries

References

Waterfalls of Hood River County, Oregon
Waterfalls of Oregon
Mount Hood National Forest